The Institut Universitaire des Sciences de l'Éducation is a Haitian higher education institution, independent and non-political, commonly known by the acronym CREFI. Its fundamental objective is to influence the quality of education through the training of trainers and multipurpose senior executives.

CREFI is the acronym that refers to the Centre for Research and Training in Sciences of Education and Psychological Intervention which and depends on the Institute.

Website 

https://www.crefi.edu.ht/

Universities in Haiti